Mountain Home, also known as Casa Loma (Spanish for "Mountain Home"), is a sparsely populated area located on the eastern side of the Santa Cruz Mountains in unincorporated southwest Santa Clara County, California near Mount Chual and Rancho Canada del Oro Open Space Preserves. The  Loma Fire burned about one half of the region in 2016.

Geography 
The area is situated within the upper Llagas Creek watershed, bounded by Mount Chual and Rancho Canada del Oro Open Space Preserves toward the north, Loma Prieta Road on the west, Loma Chiquita Road on the south, and Twin Creeks Road on the east.  The region includes small communities along Casa Loma Road, Mt Chual Spur Road, and Twin Falls Road.

The area is mostly mountain ridges with steep, sloping terrain and narrow canyons.  The Berrocal Fault runs diagonally through the center of the area.

Native vegetation ranges from a mixed conifer-oak woodland along the mountain ridges, to chaparral and coastal scrub along the slopes, to riparian flora along the canyon floors.

Climate 
According to the Köppen climate classification system, Mountain Home has a warm-summer Mediterranean climate, abbreviated "Csb" on climate maps.

History 
In 2016, the Loma Fire burned through approximately half the region, with multiple homes damaged or destroyed.

References 

Unincorporated communities in Santa Clara County, California
Unincorporated communities in California